Lindsay Davenport was the defending champion, but did not compete this year.

Serena Williams won the title by defeating Julie Halard-Decugis 7–5, 6–1 in the final.

Seeds
The first four seeds received a bye into the second round.

Draw

Finals

Top half

Bottom half

References

External links
 Official results archive (ITF)
 Official results archive (WTA)

Singles
Toyota Princess Cup - Singles